Philadelphia Style is a magazine pertaining to fashion, beauty, travel, philanthropy, entertainment, home décor, architecture, and real estate to readers in the metropolitan Philadelphia region. It is a guide to the business, people, places, and events that define the character of this historic and culturally rich city.

History and profile
Philadelphia Style was started in 1997 by John M. Colabelli, Publisher and CEO. It was part of DLG Media Holdings. Niche Media, which was founded by Jason Binn in 1992, acquired the publication. It was published seven times a year, but was raised to ten times a year in 2018. Niche Media was renamed GreenGale Publishing in 2018. GreenGale was acquired by Modern Luxury in 2017.

Antonia DePace currently serves as the Editor-in-Chief and has since November of 2021, and Kristin Detterline served from 2009 to 2021.

References

External links

1997 establishments in Pennsylvania
Lifestyle magazines published in the United States
City guides
Local interest magazines published in the United States
Magazines established in 1997
Magazines published in Philadelphia